Two Hunters is the second album by black metal band Wolves in the Throne Room and their debut album on Southern Lord Records. The band made minimal use of any digital effects or manipulation in the recording process. The vinyl version includes an extended version of "Cleansing" (which is about 6 minutes longer) and a previously unreleased track "To Reveal". Two Hunters was critically acclaimed and succeeded in putting the band on the forefront for the black metal scene.  The Daymare Recordings release also contains their 2005 demo on a second disk.

Track listing

Original issue

Double vinyl track listing

Personnel
Wolves in the Throne Room;
Nathan Weaver – guitar, vocals
Aaron Weaver – drums
Rick Dahlin – guitar, vocals

Additional musicians
Jessika Kenney – vocals on tracks 3 and 4

Production
Wolves in the Throne Room – production
Randall Dunn – production, engineering, mixing
Mell Dettmer – engineering, mixing, mastering
Christophe Szpajdel – logo

References

2007 albums
Wolves in the Throne Room albums
Southern Lord Records albums
Albums produced by Randall Dunn